Sultan (1816-) was a British-bred Thoroughbred racehorse and a leading sire in Great Britain and Ireland for six successive seasons.

Breeding
He was by Selim (sire of six classics winners), out of Bacchante by Williamson's Ditto. Sultan was inbred to three great sires, Herod (4m x 4f), Eclipse (4m x 4f), to Herod's best son, Highflyer (4 x 4). Sultan was a bay with a blaze, a sock on off (right) fore and near (left) hind, stocking near fore and off hind leg. He had a refined, beautiful head, well-sprung ribs, deep girth, and muscular, powerful hindquarters. Although he was a long horse he was a good weight carrier and sound, racing until the age of eight.

Racing career
Sultan had a good race record, winning 14 times. As a two-year-old, racing for Crockford, he placed third in the July Stakes, and second in the Derby Stakes, losing to Tiresias. He was one of the favorites in the St. Leger Stakes, but broke down in his morning gallop before the race. As a four-year-old, he placed second in the Port Stakes. When five, he won the Gold Cup at Newmarket Racecourse. He beat Gustavus (a Derby winner) in a match race as a six-year-old.

When he was seven, Sultan was purchased by Lord Exeter. Racing for him, the stallion won the Trial Stakes for a second time, another race at Newmarket, which was his preferred venue for running.

Stud record

Sultan was then retired to the Marquis' stud farm at Burghley. He went on to be the leading sire in Great Britain & Ireland for six consecutive years (1832-1837).

Sultan, a tail-male descendant of Herod, maintained the Byerley Turk sire line through to Djebel and to the present.

Pedigree

Sire line tree

Sultan
Augustus
Mahmoud
Hoemus
Beiram
Phlegon
Leopold
Phaeton
Alpheus
Evenus
Despot
Hooton
Brill
Divan
Ishmael
Ilderim
Ishmaelite
Harold
Dr. Jenner
Vaccination
Hambledon
The Star of Erin
Abd El Kader
Burgundy
Old Malt
Shanbally
Glencoe
Thornhill
Winnebago
Glencoe (Howard)
Union
Highlander
Everlasting
Star Davis
Jerome Edger
Metaire
Day Star
Darby
Vandal
Jack the Barber
John Bell
Fearnaught
Revill
Volcian
Therit
Virgil
Vigil
Vagrant
Hindoo
Van Buren
Vanguard
Isaac Murphy
Ben Ali
Tremont
Pompey Payne
Versailles
Ira E. Bride
Survivor
Council Bluffs
Vagabond
Judge Morrow
Vicksburg
Voltigeur
Princeton
Little Arthur
Pryor
Bay Dick
Bay Wood
Bonnie Laddie
Foreigner
France
King Bird
Glencoe Jr.
Walnut
O'Meara
Trumeter
Young Trumpeter
Glencoe (Hunter)
Ibrahim
Bay Middleton
Bramble
Farintosh
Gaper
Bay Momus
Pastoral
Collingwood
Cowl
The Confessor
Cock-a-Hoop
The Friar
The Grand Inquisitor
Capucine
Joy
Gabbler
Planet
Aster
The Flying Dutchman
Ellington
Delight
Fly-By-Night
Peter Wilkens
The Quack
Benvolio
Flying Pieman
Old England
Ignoramus
Purston
Sir Watkin
Amsterdam
Duneany
Glenbuck
The Rover
Cape Flyaway
Good Hope
Tom Bowline
Make Haste
Winton
Young Dutchman
Ellerton
Romulus
Walloon
Dollar
Dami
Il Maestro
Salvanos
Androcles
Saint Cyr
Salvator
Fountainebleau
Patriarche
Thieusies
Greenback
Prologue
Vignemale
Louis D'Or
Saumur
Cimier
Garrick
Martin Pecheur
Sansonnet
The Condor
Souci
Upas
Acheron
Bocage
Dauphin
Cerbere
Tourmalet
Guillame Le Taciturne
Dutch Skater
Insulaire
Burgomaster
Dutch Roller
Sherbrooke
Yellow
Accumulator
Massinissa
Jarnac
Old Tom
St. Aubyn
Hesperus
Sir Birtram
Diomedes
Parawhenua
Kakupo
Barbatus
Vanderdecken
Andover
Craymond
Harmonium
Post Haste
Walkington
The Hermit
Freetrader
Milton
Anton
Hampton
Achmet
Dardanelles
Hibiscus
Jereed
Great Heart
Nat
The Bishop of Romford's Cob
The Free Lance
Sultan Jr.
Wisdom
Caesar
Clarion
Kremlin
Scutari

References

1816 racehorse births
Racehorses trained in the United Kingdom
Racehorses bred in the United Kingdom
Thoroughbred family 8-b
Byerley Turk sire line